Alexander Laird (1830 – August 9, 1896) was a farmer and political figure in Prince Edward Island. He represented 4th Prince in the Legislative Assembly of Prince Edward Island from 1867 to 1870 and served in the Legislative Council from 1874 to 1882 and from 1886 to 1896 as a Liberal member.

Biography
Laird was born in New Glasgow, Prince Edward Island, the son of Alexander Laird, and grew up there. He established himself as a farmer in Wilmot Valley. He married Rebecca P. Read in 1864. He ran unsuccessfully for a seat in the provincial assembly in 1882. In 1884, Laird married Ann Carruthers following the death of his first wife. Laird helped found the Agricultural Mutual Fire Insurance Company and served as its president. He was also president of the Farmers and Dairymen's Association. Laird was president of a Summerside newspaper, the Pioneer. He served in the provincial cabinet from 1891 until his death in Wilmot Valley in 1896.

Laird's brother David served in the House of Commons and as Lieutenant-Governor for the Northwest Territories. His brother William also served in the provincial assembly.

External links 
Biography at the Dictionary of Canadian Biography Online

1830 births
1896 deaths
People from Queens County, Prince Edward Island
Prince Edward Island Liberal Party MLAs
Prince Edward Island Liberal Party MLCs
Colony of Prince Edward Island people